Henning Bürger (born 16 December 1969) is a German professional football coach and a former player. He is the caretaker manager of FC Carl Zeiss Jena. As a player, he spent three seasons in the DDR-Oberliga with FC Carl Zeiss Jena, as well as five seasons in the Bundesliga with FC Schalke 04, 1. FC Saarbrücken, 1. FC Nürnberg, FC St. Pauli, and Eintracht Frankfurt.

Coaching career
Bürger took over as manager of then 2. Bundesliga side FC Carl Zeiss Jena in 2008, but could not prevent the club's relegation to the 3. Liga at the end of the season. He was released by Jena after a 0–6 defeat on 14 September 2008 against VfB Stuttgart II. Since 2011, Bürger manages the reserve side of Eintracht Braunschweig. During the 2015–16 season, Bürger additionally worked as assistant coach of Eintracht's first team.

References

External links

1969 births
Living people
People from Zeulenroda-Triebes
People from Bezirk Gera
Association football midfielders
German footballers
East German footballers
Footballers from Thuringia
German football managers
FC Carl Zeiss Jena players
FC Schalke 04 players
1. FC Saarbrücken players
1. FC Nürnberg players
FC St. Pauli players
Eintracht Frankfurt players
FC Rot-Weiß Erfurt players
DDR-Oberliga players
Bundesliga players
2. Bundesliga players
FC Carl Zeiss Jena managers
2. Bundesliga managers
3. Liga managers
Eintracht Braunschweig non-playing staff